Broken Dreams may refer to: 
Broken Dreams: Vanity, Greed and the Souring of British Football, 2003 book by Tom Bower
 Broken Dreams (1933 film), starring Randolph Scott
 Broken Dreams, 2011 film by Fathia Absie
 Broken Dreams (2019 film), a 2019 Polish documentary film directed by Tomasz Magierski